Maksim Aleksandrovich Yablonsky (born 15 August 1996) is a Belarusian professional footballer who plays for Neman Grodno.

References

External links 
 
 

1996 births
Living people
Belarusian footballers
Association football defenders
FC Smorgon players
FC Neman Grodno players